Bhalobaslei Ghor Bandha Jay Na is a 2010 Dhallywood drama film directed by Zakir Hossain Raju, who also wrote the story and screenplay, and produced by Mastex Production. The film stars Shakib Khan, Apu Biswas and Rumana. It was highly successful, critically and commercially. The film won seven National Film Awards including Best Actor and two Meril Prothom Alo Awards. Shakib Khan won his first Bangladesh National Film Awards for this film.

Cast
 Shakib Khan as Surjo Khan
 Apu Biswas as Alo 
 Rumana Khan as Ojanta
 Misha Sawdagor as Turjo Khan
 Kazi Hayat
 Khaleda Akter Kolpona
 Ali Raj
 Prabir Mitra
 Arjumand Ara Bokul
 Afzal Sharif 
 Chikon Ali
 Kala Aziz
 Md Zakir Hossain Dancer in Club

Soundtrack 

The soundtrack of Bhalobaslei Ghor Bandha Jay Na was directed by Ali Akram Shuvo and composed by Sheikh Sadi Khan.

Track listing

Box office
 The film was the 2nd highest-grossing film of 2010 after Number One Shakib Khan, another Shakib Khan-starrer.

Home media
The DVD and VCD of the film were released in 2011 by Anupom.

Accolades
National Film Award - 2010
won. Best actor: Shakib Khan
won. Best Supporting Actress: Rumana Khan
won. Best Screenplay & writer: Jakir Hossain Raju
won. Best Male Playback Singer: S.I. Tutul for: Buker Bhitor
won. Best FeMale Playback Singer: Shammi Akhtar for: Bhalobaslei Ghor Bandha Jay Na
won. Best music composer : Sheikh Sadi Khan
Meril Prothom Alo Awards - 2010
won. Best actor: Shakib Khan
Nominated. Best actress: Apu Biswas
won. Best Supporting Actress: Rumana

References

External links
 

2010 films
2010 drama films
Bengali-language Bangladeshi films
Bangladeshi drama films
Films scored by Ali Akram Shuvo
2010s Bengali-language films
Films directed by Zakir Hossain Raju